Utsav Gold is a European Hindi pay television movie channel broadcasting across Europe and is owned by Disney Star which is part of Disney India. The channel telecasts mainstream Bollywood movies. Its programming is in Hindi and subtitled in English.

History
The channel launched as Star Gold in September 2000 as a Hindi movie channel. On 6 December 2017 it launched its HD channel in the UK.

On 30 December 2020, Disney announced that the Star branding will be replaced with Utsav across Europe from 22 January 2021.

References

Hindi-language television channels in India
Television stations in Mumbai
Television channels and stations established in 2021
Foreign television channels broadcasting in the United Kingdom
Disney Star